Platysuchus ("flat crocodile") is an extinct genus of teleosaurid crocodyliform from the Early Jurassic (Toarcian) of southern Germany and Luxembourg.

Taxonomy
 
Platysuchus was originally described as a member of the genus Mystriosaurus, as M. multiscrobiculatus. However, Westphal (1961) found M. multiscrobiculatus generically distinct from Mystriosaurus and renamed it Platysuchus.

Distribution
Platysuchus has been found in Toarcian age marine deposits in southern Germany and Luxembourg.

References

External links
Angellis Net pdf

Prehistoric pseudosuchian genera
Prehistoric marine crocodylomorphs
Early Jurassic crocodylomorphs
Early Jurassic reptiles of Europe
Jurassic Germany
Thalattosuchians